Peruvian Americans are Americans of Peruvian descent.

According to the U.S. Census Bureau 2021 American Community Survey 1-Year Estimates, 720,626 U.S. residents identify themselves as being of Peruvian origin. Approximately 62% of Peruvian Americans were born in Peru, with a growing population of Peruvian Americans being born in the United States.

Peruvian Americans immigrated to the United States in four major waves. Small but significant waves of immigration occurred in San Francisco during the gold rush (along with Chilean miners beginning in 1848) and the Metro Detroit area in the 1950s. Another wave of immigration occurred again early in the twentieth century, due largely to the burgeoning textile industry in New York and New Jersey. In the 1950s, there were a reported approximate 100 Peruvian families that resided in Paterson, New Jersey.

Beginning in the 1970s another wave of Peruvians arrived in the United States, most of whom were fleeing Peru's militaristic government under the dictatorships of Juan Velasco Alvarado and Francisco Morales Bermúdez both marked by coups and socio-economic instability. The 1980s and 1990s saw the most significant influx of Peruvians to U.S. shores, this time in response to the hyperinflation crisis that plagued the Peruvian economy, internal unrest in Peru by terrorist groups, and an authoritarian government headed by Peruvian President Alberto Fujimori.

Immigrants often come from urban areas of Peru, especially Lima, and the majority settle in the New York City metropolitan area—particularly in Paterson and Passaic in New Jersey and the New York City borough of Queens. Peruvian Americans are also clustered in the metropolitan areas of Miami; Los Angeles; Houston, Texas; Washington, D.C.; and Virginia.

Recently, Peru has enjoyed economic growth and political stability since the start of the millennia. As a result, there has been a decline in the amount of Peruvian immigration to the United States unto 2019 under economic pretenses and instead for education.

Settlement in the United States 
The states with the largest number of Peruvian Americans are Florida, California, New Jersey, and New York. Texas and Virginia are also home to significant communities of people of Peruvian descent.

Little is known about the earliest Peruvian immigrants who came to the United States during the California gold rush. Later Peruvian immigrants began arriving in the early twentieth century to work in textile mills in Paterson, New Jersey, which is now home to one of the largest Peruvian communities in the United States. Paterson has a significant number of businesses run by Peruvian Americans, as well as social and political organizations, and remains a destination for Peruvian immigrants of all social classes.

Immigration 
Undocumented Peruvian Americans make up less than 1% of the total undocumented immigrant population in the United States according to 2015 report from the U.S. Department of Homeland Security. In Fiscal Year 2019, 10,049 Peruvians immigrated to the United States.

Lifestyle and culture
The most famous and first aspect of Peruvian culture that deals with the United States is the book, "The Incas's Florida" La Florida del Inca written at the end of sixteenth century by the Inca Garcilaso de la Vega. Garcilaso's book details the travels of the explorer Hernando de Soto who had participated in the Forty-Years War between the Incas and the Spanish (1531–1571) and who later came to the lands that would become part of the United States and that the Spanish called "Florida."

The most popular dishes of Peruvian food in the U.S. include ceviche (raw fish "cooked" in lime juice), papa a la huancaína, and anticuchos y tamales. Peruvian cuisine is often recognized for being one of the most diverse and appreciated of the world's cuisines, with influences including Native American, European, and African.  Since there is a sizable Chinese and Japanese minority in Peru, an Asian influence has also been deeply incorporated in Peruvian cuisine.  There are Chifas, or Asian-style Peruvian restaurants that serve typical Chinese or Japanese food with a Peruvian culinary influence.  Inca Kola, a soda that originated in Peru, is sold in many heavily concentrated Latin American areas.

The extended family commonly serves an economic function, too, with some new immigrants temporarily living with extended family already established in the United States, and in expensive urban centers, such arrangements sometimes are permanent.

Socioeconomic status
Nearly half of Peruvians have resided in the United States for over 20 years, with 46% of foreign-born Peruvians reported to have lived in the United States for 20 years or more.

Despite being a relatively recent ethnic group, the median household income for Peruvians meets the average American household income and 44% of Peruvians born in the United States over the age of 25 have college degrees, exceeding the U.S. national average of 24%.

Around 90% of Peruvians lived above the poverty rate in 2017, with a poverty rate of 10% compared to the United States national average of 12.3% that same year.

Activism
The Peruvian American Coalition in Passaic, New Jersey functions as an activist organization on behalf of the overall welfare of Peruvian Americans.

Demographics
Peruvians have settled throughout the United States, migrating particularly to Northern New Jersey and the New York City Metropolitan Area, the Miami metropolitan area, the Washington Metropolitan Area, and the Los Angeles metropolitan area.

Notably, a rapidly growing number of Peruvian Americans, about 10,000 in 2018, have established an increasingly prominent community in Paterson, New Jersey, which is considered by many to be the capital of the Peruvian Diaspora in the United States, partially owing to the presence of the Peruvian Consulate. Market Street, the Little Lima in downtown Paterson, is the largest Peruvian American enclave and is lined with Peruvian-owned restaurants, bakeries, delicatessens, bodegas, travel agencies, and other businesses. The Peruvian American community has expanded into Paterson's neighboring areas of Fair Lawn, Elmwood Park, Clifton, and Passaic in Northern New Jersey as well, all within the New York City Metropolitan Area. The annual Peruvian Independence Day Parade is held in Paterson.

States with highest Peruvian population

The 10 states with the largest Peruvian population were (Source: Census 2017):
Florida – 100,965 (0.5% of state population)
California – 91,511 (0.2% of state population)
New Jersey – 75,869 (0.9% of state population)
New York – 66,318 (0.3% of state population)
Virginia – 29,096 (0.4% of state population)
Texas – 22,605 (0.1% of state population)
Maryland – 18,229 (0.3% of state population)
Connecticut – 16,424 (0.5% of state population)
Georgia – 10,570 (0.1% of state population)
Illinois – 10,213 (0.2% of state population)

The U.S. state with the smallest Peruvian population (as of 2010) was North Dakota with 78 Peruvians (less than 0.1% of state population).

Metro Areas 
The top 5 U.S. metropolitan areas with the largest Peruvian population were:

New Jersey-New York Greater Area – 182,672
Miami Metropolitan Area – 81,729
Washington, D.C. – 53,961
Los Angeles metropolitan area – 48,380
San Francisco Bay Area – 26,969

Notable people

Artists 

 Alex Acuña – drummer and percussionist
 Miguel Harth-Bedoya – conductor
 Roberto Eyzaguirre – classical pianist and famed piano pedagogue
 Gabriela Lena Frank – American pianist and composer of contemporary classical music
 Josh Keaton – actor, singer and musical producer
 Isabela Moner – actress, voice actress, singer, songwriter, dancer and ukulele player
 Adele Morales – American painter and memoirist; of Spanish and Peruvian descent
 Plavka – American singer of Croatian and Peruvian origin
 Susana Raab – Award-winning fine arts photographer based in Washington, D.C.
Kat Reeder – artist, illustrator and graphic designer
Ginger Reyes – rock musician
Alex Rivera – U.S. filmmaker specialising in films about labor, immigration, and politics
Carmen Giménez Smith – American poet, writer, and editor
Tony Succar – Peruvian born American musician, composer, arranger and producer
Yma Sumac – indigenous soprano
Mario Testino – photographer
Boris Vallejo – Peruvian-born American painter
Alberto Vargas – painter

Entertainment 

 Jorge Andres – Award Winning National Sportscaster and Former ESPN Sportscenter Anchor
 Alexis Amore – pornographic actress
 Daniella Alonso – American actress. Her father is from Peru, of Japanese origins.
 Miguel Arteta – Son of a Peruvian, director of film and television, known for his independent film Chuck & Buck (2000), for which he received the Independent Spirit John Cassavetes Award, and Cedar Rapids.
 Amber Barretto – American actress
David Bernal – illusionary dancer
Benjamin Bratt – actor, Peruvian on his mother's side
Pepe Barreto – community and entertainment reporter for KMEX-TV, Channel 34
Jorge Benitez – (also known as George Benitez) former U.S. soccer forward
Julio C. Canani – Peruvian trainer in American Thoroughbred horse racing who has won three Breeders' Cup races.
David Torrence – athlete, he has a U.S. record of 1,000 meters; and he has also represented Peru at the 2016 Rio de Janeiro Olympic Games. He was born in Japan and has Peruvian ancestry per his mother; his father is American.
Roberto Carcelen – Peruvian-American cross-country skier
Carmen Carrera – American model of Peruvian and Puerto Rican descent
Diego Chávarri – soccer player
Jorge Masvidal - mixed martial artist of Peruvian-Cuban descent
Cesar Conde – Chairman NBC Universal International Group & Telemundo Enterprises
Kenny Florian – mixed martial artist
Richard Green – soccer defender
Kathleen Herles – American voice actress
Q'orianka Kilcher – actress
Pedro Pablo León – soccer forward
 Carlos Navarro, American actor and radio personality
Alex Olmedo – former tennis player from Peru with American citizenship
Luis Palomino – Peruvian-American mixed martial artist who competes in the lightweight division
Edgar Prado – jockey
Rosa Salazar – American actress of Peruvian descent
Tom Segura – Peruvian-American stand-up comedian
Daniel Tuccio – Peruvian-American television reporter/news anchor
Jose Valdivia, Jr. – jockey in American thoroughbred horse racing
Carlos De Valdez (1894–1939) – Peruvian film actor who appeared in around forty American films. He spend the last years of his life in United States (where he died).

Politics 

Juan Bandini – (1800–1859) early settler of what would become San Diego, California
Fernando Belaúnde Terry – American educator, former President of Peru (1963–1968; 1980–1985) 
Robert Garcia – Mayor of Long Beach, California, Member-elect of the U.S. House of Representatives from California's 42nd district (first Peruvian-American elected to Congress)
Alvaro Bedoya, nominee to serve on the Federal Trade Commission (FTC)
Augusto B. Leguía – businessman, former Prime Minister of Peru, former President of Peru (1908–1912; 1919–1930)
Pedro Pablo Kuczynski – former President of Peru (2016–2018)
Alejandro Toledo – former President of Peru (2001–2006)

As of 2020, four Presidents of Peru are or were Peruvian-Americans.

Sciences 

 Anthony Atala – medical doctor and professor; Peruvian born, and American raised.
 Carlos Bustamante – biologist
 Carlos Castaneda – philosopher
 Carlos I. Noriega – astronaut
 Wenceslaus Sarmiento – also known as W.A. Sarmiento, Peruvian-born American modernist architect
Barton Zwiebach – physicist working on String Theory

Journalism 

Daniel Alarcón – Peruvian born, American raised author
Marie Arana – editor, journalist and Peruvian born author
Mandalit del Barco – general assignment reporter for National Public Radio
Monica Brown (author) – children's book author, Peruvian on her mother's side
Lorenzo O'Brien – writer-producer
Alex Kuczynski – journalist
Jaime Bayly – writer, journalist and television presenter

Other 

Arthur Chin – America's first flying ace in World War II
McKenna DeBever – Swimmer
David Utrilla – 31st member of the Utah Corps of Consuls

See also

Peru–United States relations

References

Further reading
 De Ferrari, Gabriella. Gringa Latina: A Woman of Two Worlds (Houghton Mifflin, 1996).
 Packel, John. "Peruvian Americans." Gale Encyclopedia of Multicultural America, edited by Thomas Riggs, (3rd ed., vol. 3, Gale, 2014), pp. 467–476. online
 Paerregaard, Karsten. "Inside the Hispanic Melting Pot: Negotiating National and Multicultural Identities among Peruvians in the United States.” Latino Studies 3 (2005): 76–96.

External links

Hispanic and Latino American